In mathematics, particularly set theory, a finite set is a set that has a finite number of elements.  Informally, a finite set is a set which one could in principle count and finish counting. For example,

is a finite set with five elements. The number of elements of a finite set is a natural number (possibly zero) and is called the cardinality (or the cardinal number) of the set. A set that is not a finite set is called an infinite set. For example, the set of all positive integers is infinite:

Finite sets are particularly important in combinatorics, the mathematical study of counting. Many arguments involving finite sets rely on the pigeonhole principle, which states that there cannot exist an injective function from a larger finite set to a smaller finite set.

Definition and terminology 

Formally, a set  is called finite if there exists a bijection

for some natural number . The empty set { } or ∅ is considered finite, with cardinality zero.

If a set is finite, its elements may be written — in many ways — in a sequence:

In combinatorics, a finite set with  elements is sometimes called an -set and a subset with  elements is called a -subset.  For example, the set {5,6,7} is a 3-set – a finite set with three elements – and {6,7} is a 2-subset of it.

(Those familiar with the definition of the natural numbers themselves as conventional in set theory, the so-called von Neumann construction, may prefer to use the existence of the bijection , which is equivalent.)

Basic properties 

Any proper subset of a finite set S is finite and has fewer elements than S itself.  As a consequence, there cannot exist a bijection between a finite set S and a proper subset of S.  Any set with this property is called Dedekind-finite.  Using the standard ZFC axioms for set theory, every Dedekind-finite set is also finite, but this implication cannot be proved in ZF (Zermelo–Fraenkel axioms without the axiom of choice) alone.
The axiom of countable choice, a weak version of the axiom of choice, is sufficient to prove this equivalence.

Any injective function between two finite sets of the same cardinality is also a surjective function (a surjection). Similarly, any surjection between two finite sets of the same cardinality is also an injection.

The union of two finite sets is finite, with

In fact, by the inclusion–exclusion principle:

More generally, the union of any finite number of finite sets is finite.  The Cartesian product of finite sets is also finite, with:

Similarly, the Cartesian product of finitely many finite sets is finite. A finite set with n elements has 2 distinct subsets.  That is, the power set P(S) of a finite set S is finite, with cardinality 2.

Any subset of a finite set is finite. The set of values of a function when applied to elements of a finite set is finite.

All finite sets are countable, but not all countable sets are finite. (Some authors, however, use "countable" to mean "countably infinite", so do not consider finite sets to be countable.)

The free semilattice over a finite set is the set of its non-empty subsets, with the join operation being given by set union.

Necessary and sufficient conditions for finiteness 

In Zermelo–Fraenkel set theory without the axiom of choice (ZF), the following conditions are all equivalent:

 S is a finite set. That is, S can be placed into a one-to-one correspondence with the set of those natural numbers less than some specific natural number.
 (Kazimierz Kuratowski) S has all properties which can be proved by mathematical induction beginning with the empty set and adding one new element at a time. (See below for the set-theoretical formulation of Kuratowski finiteness.)
 (Paul Stäckel) S can be given a total ordering which is well-ordered both forwards and backwards. That is, every non-empty subset of S has both a least and a greatest element in the subset.
 Every one-to-one function from P(P(S)) into itself is onto. That is, the powerset of the powerset of S is Dedekind-finite (see below).
 Every surjective function from P(P(S)) onto itself is one-to-one.
 (Alfred Tarski) Every non-empty family of subsets of S has a minimal element with respect to inclusion. (Equivalently, every non-empty family of subsets of S has a maximal element with respect to inclusion.)
 S can be well-ordered and any two well-orderings on it are order isomorphic. In other words, the well-orderings on S have exactly one order type.

If the axiom of choice is also assumed (the axiom of countable choice is sufficient), then the following conditions are all equivalent:

 S is a finite set.
 (Richard Dedekind) Every one-to-one function from S into itself is onto.
 Every surjective function from S onto itself is one-to-one.
 S is empty or every partial ordering of S contains a maximal element.

Foundational issues 

Georg Cantor initiated his theory of sets in order to provide a mathematical treatment of infinite sets. Thus the distinction between the finite and the infinite lies at the core of set theory. Certain foundationalists, the strict finitists, reject the existence of infinite sets and thus recommend a mathematics based solely on finite sets. Mainstream mathematicians consider strict finitism too confining, but acknowledge its relative consistency: the universe of hereditarily finite sets constitutes a model of Zermelo–Fraenkel set theory with the axiom of infinity replaced by its negation.

Even for the majority of mathematicians that embrace infinite sets, in certain important contexts, the formal distinction between the finite and the infinite can remain a delicate matter. The difficulty stems from Gödel's incompleteness theorems. One can interpret the theory of hereditarily finite sets within Peano arithmetic (and certainly also vice versa), so the incompleteness of the theory of Peano arithmetic implies that of the theory of hereditarily finite sets. In particular, there exists a plethora of so-called non-standard models of both theories. A seeming paradox is that there are non-standard models of the theory of hereditarily finite sets which contain infinite sets, but these infinite sets look finite from within the model. (This can happen when the model lacks the sets or functions necessary to witness the infinitude of these sets.) On account of the incompleteness theorems, no first-order predicate, nor even any recursive scheme of first-order predicates, can characterize the standard part of all such models.  So, at least from the point of view of first-order logic, one can only hope to describe finiteness approximately.

More generally, informal notions like set, and particularly finite set, may receive interpretations across a range of formal systems varying in their axiomatics and logical apparatus. The best known axiomatic set theories include Zermelo-Fraenkel set theory (ZF), Zermelo-Fraenkel set theory with the Axiom of Choice (ZFC), Von Neumann–Bernays–Gödel set theory (NBG), Non-well-founded set theory, Bertrand Russell's Type theory and all the theories of their various models. One may also choose among classical first-order logic, various higher-order logics and intuitionistic logic.

A formalist might see the meaning of set varying from system to system. Some kinds of Platonists might view particular formal systems as approximating an underlying reality.

Set-theoretic definitions of finiteness 

In contexts where the notion of natural number sits logically prior to any notion of set, one can define a set S as finite if S admits a bijection to some set of natural numbers of the form . Mathematicians more typically choose to ground notions of number in set theory, for example they might model natural numbers by the order types of finite well-ordered sets. Such an approach requires a structural definition of finiteness that does not depend on natural numbers.

Various properties that single out the finite sets among all sets in the theory ZFC turn out logically inequivalent in weaker systems such as ZF or intuitionistic set theories. Two definitions feature prominently in the literature, one due to Richard Dedekind, the other to Kazimierz Kuratowski. (Kuratowski's is the definition used above.)

A set S is called Dedekind infinite if there exists an injective, non-surjective function . Such a function exhibits a bijection between S and a proper subset of S, namely the image of f.  Given a Dedekind infinite set S, a function f, and an element x that is not in the image of f, we can form an infinite sequence of distinct elements of S, namely . Conversely, given a sequence in S consisting of distinct elements , we can define a function f such that on elements in the sequence  and f behaves like the identity function otherwise.  Thus Dedekind infinite sets contain subsets that correspond bijectively with the natural numbers. Dedekind finite naturally means that every injective self-map is also surjective.

 Kuratowski finiteness is defined as follows. Given any set S, the binary operation of union endows the powerset P(S) with the structure of a semilattice.  Writing K(S) for the sub-semilattice generated by the empty set and the singletons, call set S Kuratowski finite if S itself belongs to K(S). Intuitively, K(S) consists of the finite subsets of S. Crucially, one does not need induction, recursion or a definition of natural numbers to define generated by since one may obtain K(S) simply by taking the intersection of all sub-semilattices containing the empty set and the singletons.

Readers unfamiliar with semilattices and other notions of abstract algebra may prefer an entirely elementary formulation. Kuratowski finite means S lies in the set K(S), constructed as follows. Write M for the set of all subsets X of P(S) such that:
 X contains the empty set;
 For every set T in P(S), if X contains T then X also contains the union of T with any singleton.
Then K(S) may be defined as the intersection of M.

In ZF, Kuratowski finite implies Dedekind finite, but not vice versa. In the parlance of a popular pedagogical formulation, when the axiom of choice fails badly, one may have an infinite family of socks with no way to choose one sock from more than finitely many of the pairs. That would make the set of such socks Dedekind finite: there can be no infinite sequence of socks, because such a sequence would allow a choice of one sock for infinitely many pairs by choosing the first sock in the sequence. However, Kuratowski finiteness would fail for the same set of socks.

Other concepts of finiteness 

In ZF set theory without the axiom of choice, the following concepts of finiteness for a set S are distinct. They are arranged in strictly decreasing order of strength, i.e. if a set S meets a criterion in the list then it meets all of the following criteria. In the absence of the axiom of choice the reverse implications are all unprovable, but if the axiom of choice is assumed then all of these concepts are equivalent. (Note that none of these definitions need the set of finite ordinal numbers to be defined first; they are all pure "set-theoretic" definitions in terms of the equality and membership relations, not involving ω.)

 I-finite. Every non-empty set of subsets of S has a ⊆-maximal element. (This is equivalent to requiring the existence of a ⊆-minimal element. It is also equivalent to the standard numerical concept of finiteness.)
 Ia-finite. For every partition of S into two sets, at least one of the two sets is I-finite. (A set with this property which is not I-finite is called an amorphous set.)
 II-finite. Every non-empty ⊆-monotone set of subsets of S has a ⊆-maximal element.
 III-finite. The power set P(S) is Dedekind finite.
 IV-finite. S is Dedekind finite.
 V-finite.  ∣S∣ = 0 or 2 ⋅&hairsp;∣S∣ > ∣S|.
 VI-finite. ∣S∣ = 0 or ∣S∣ = 1 or ∣S∣2 > ∣S∣.
 VII-finite. S is I-finite or not well-orderable.

The forward implications (from strong to weak) are theorems within ZF. Counter-examples to the reverse implications (from weak to strong) in ZF with urelements are found using model theory.

At that time, model theory was not sufficiently advanced to find the counter-examples.

Each of the properties I-finite thru IV-finite is a notion of smallness in the sense that any subset of a set with such a property will also have the property. This is not true for V-finite thru VII-finite because they may have countably infinite subsets.

See also 

FinSet
Ordinal number
Peano arithmetic

Notes

References

External links 

Basic concepts in set theory
Cardinal numbers